Central Park is a park in Cianjin District, Kaohsiung, Taiwan. The park is an oasis of greenery in the midst of a heavily built-up urban area.

History

City planners first conceived of, and set aside space for, a park at Central Park's current location during the period when Taiwan was under Japanese rule. Later on, planners during the early period of Republic of China rule referred to the concept as Park Number 15.

Central Park formally came into being in 1976. At one point, the park featured a library, basketball courts, tennis courts, a parking lot, the District swimming pool, and Sun Yat-sen Arena. The park was adopted by the Rotary Club and thus also became known as Rotary Park.

In the 1990s, most of the built-up areas were removed and replaced with grassy or wooded parkland. This was the result of the efforts of environmentalist groups, and dovetailed with the construction of the MRT Red Line. The Kaohsiung Rapid Transit Corporation footed the bill for the conversion.

In February 2014, it came to light that city officials had privately come to an agreement with a charitable organization founded on behalf of a deceased lumber tycoon to pave over a wooded area at the northwest corner of Central Park and erect a public library bearing the name of said individual. A wide array of local citizens have arisen to oppose the proposed partial paving over of Central Park.

Features

Central Park includes Kaohsiung Literature Library, Scenic Lake, Middle Island, Speech Square, Water Square, Hedgerow Labyrinth and Outdoor Terrace. Water Square offers 20-minute-long "water dances" several times a day.

Transportation
The park is accessible from Central Park Station of Kaohsiung MRT. The main exit of the station is located at the east edge of the park.

See also
 List of parks in Taiwan

References

1976 establishments in Taiwan
Parks established in 1976
Parks in Kaohsiung